, (born 24 September 1968 in Mitsukaido, Ibaraki Prefecture, Japan), is a Japanese actress.

Filmography

Television
The Queen's Classroom (2005)
Keishicho Sōsa Ikka 9 gakari (2006–)
Hiyokko (2017), Kimiko Sukegawa

Film
No Worries on the Recruit Front (1991)
Flowers of Shanghai (1998)
Infection (2004), Dr. Nakazono
This Old Road: Konomichi (2019), Yosano Akiko
Show Me the Way to the Station (2019)

References

External links

JMDb Profile (in Japanese)

1968 births
Living people
Japanese actresses